Gunnera mixta is a species of Gunnera native to New Zealand.

The species is visually similar to Gunnera strigosa, but with differences in the leaf shape and hair distribution. The fruits are small, only 2 millimetres in length, and red to reddish-yellow. It grows in moist, lowland forests and grasslands.

References 

mixta
Taxa named by Thomas Kirk
Flora of New Zealand